Hamid Hayat (born September 10, 1983) is a United States citizen of Pakistani descent from Lodi, California. His father, Umer Hayat (born January 5, 1958), was born in Pakistan and immigrated to the United States in 1976; he is a naturalized U.S. citizen. Together, they were the subjects of the first terrorism trial in the state of California. Both were alleged to be part of, or associated with, a terrorist sleeper cell.

In 2019, a judge recommended that the younger Hayat's conviction be overturned, citing an ineffective legal defense for Hayat who was defended by a lawyer who had never previously served in a criminal case in a federal court. The recommendation also cited a coerced confession obtained by the FBI, which one former agent described as the “sorriest confession” he had ever seen. It should be noted, however, that the FBI responded to these critiques noting that the portion of the interview critiqued by the former agent had actually been post-confession. The interview had continued beyond the confession in an effort to gain a better understanding of any terrorism threats and to fill in the intelligence picture. The former agent had also been requested, by the defense, to appear as an expert witness on terrorism but was deemed unqualified by the court. Specifically, his submission failed to demonstrate sufficient experience or skill in terrorism matters or investigations to appear on the stand.The FBI's rebuttal to Wedick's accusations

Terrorism charges and trial
In June 2005, Hamid Hayat was arrested and charged with providing material support to terrorists, and of lying about it to FBI agents. The prosecution alleged that Hamid Hayat had spent the better part of two years at an al-Qaeda training camp in Pakistan, returning in 2005 with an intent to attack civilian targets in the United States. The defense contended that Hayat was in Pakistan to engage an arranged marriage. On April 25, 2006, a jury voted to convict Hamid Hayat of one count of providing material support or resources to terrorists and three counts of making false statements to the FBI in matters related to international or domestic terrorism. The maximum penalty for these charges is 39 years of imprisonment. Sentencing was set for July 14, 2006, before U.S. District Judge Garland E. Burrell Jr.

His father, Umer Hayat, was also arrested and charged with two counts of making false statements to the FBI regarding the investigation of his son and of certain members of the Muslim community of Lodi. The elder Hayat's charges ended in a hung jury. When faced with a retrial for the same offenses, he pled guilty in exchange for a release with time served.

Debate
The younger Hayat's conviction is controversial in some circles. Supporters of the Hayats contended that they were both innocent and had been railroaded by overzealous FBI agents and post-9/11 Islamophobia. They cited the occasionally outlandish nature of the confessions, especially the elder Hayat's in particular in which he described a supposed al-Qaeda training camp populated by a thousand men doing "pole vault" practice in ninja masks (Teenage Mutant Ninja Turtle masks, according to the Los Angeles Times).

Hamid Hayat's attorney, Wazhma Mojaddidi, also claimed that he had been worn down by the FBI's five-hour interrogation and confessed to crimes that he did not commit. Hamid and Umer Hayat's separate videotaped confessions were the linchpin of the government's case. Former FBI agent James Wedick Jr., a veteran of 35 years, believed that the confessions had been coaxed with intimidation and leading questions. Wedick was never allowed to testify and present his analysis of the confession videotapes at Hamid Hayat's original trial. Prior to being contacted by defense attorneys for Hamid Hayat, Wedick had had no knowledge of, or involvement with, the case.

The government argued that there was a greater pattern at work. A government informant taped the younger Hayat as saying, regarding the murder of Daniel Pearl by Pakistani terrorists, "They killed him. So I'm pleased about that. They cut him into pieces and sent him back. That was a good job they did. Now they can't send one Jewish person to Pakistan." FBI agents also recovered from his room jihadist magazines (e.g. of the Jaish-e-Mohammed) and a "jihad scrapbook" containing articles praising the Taliban and Osama Bin Laden. He also carried in his wallet a supposed "jihadi supplication" reading "O Allah we place you at their throats and we seek refuge in you from their evils."

Much was made of how Umer Hayat seemed to possess sums of cash unusual for an ice cream truck driver with only an 8th grade education (e.g. a $390,000 home with no outstanding debt). According to U.S. District Judge Garland E. Burrell Jr., Hayat "appears to have access to a significant amount of cash from an unexplained source."

Motion for a new trial
After his initial conviction, Hamid Hayat sought a new trial, for which his attorneys, Wazhma Mojaddidi and Dennis Riordan, filed a motion on the grounds of misconduct by jury foreman Joseph Cote as well as other court misconduct. Cote allegedly used racial slurs during the trial and compared Hayat to the Pakistani men who had conducted the recent terrorist attacks in London (see 7 July 2005 London bombings and 21 July 2005 London bombings). Cote also contacted an excused alternative juror during deliberations.

The hearing was held on April 6, 2007. On May 17, 2007, U.S. District Judge Garland E. Burrell Jr. rejected a new trial for Hamid Hayat, writing in his ruling that the reports of juror misconduct were not credible. Hamid Hayat's defense attorney, Wazhma Mojaddidi, announced plans to appeal.

September 2007 sentencing
On September 10, 2007, Hamid Hayat was sentenced to 24 years in federal prison. It was his 25th birthday. In the words of Judge Burrell Jr., Hayat had re-entered the U.S. "ready and willing to wage violent jihad."

Pre-crime 
The Hamid Hayat case is seen as an example of a pre-crime conviction (McCulloch and Wilson 2016).  The dissenting Judge Tashima in Hayat's unsuccessful appeal argued that he would reverse the conviction "because the judicial branch's constitutional duty to do justice in criminal prosecutions was not fulfilled in this case in which the government asked a jury to deprive a man of his liberty largely based on dire, but vague, predictions that the defendant might commit unspecified crimes in the future" (United States v Hayat 2013: 4, 59, emphasis in original). Judge Tashima acknowledged that the law permitted conviction on the basis that the defendant might commit such unspecified crimes in the future, but argued that, when the law allows for such convictions, every aspect of the trial should be scrupulously fair, and that Hayat's trial did not meet this standard. The majority likewise described the government's "preventative approach" as "one that permits the conviction of potential terrorists who may never in fact have committed any terrorist act if not arrested and convicted" (United States v Hayat 2013: 24).

The Confession Tapes
In 2019, Hamid Hayat's story was featured in Season 2 of Netflix's documentary series The Confession Tapes in an episode entitled "Marching Orders".

US Government's Dismissal of All Charges 
In February 2019, the U.S. Government dismissed all charges. In a statement, Hayat's legal team, led by Riordan and Horgan, said “Hamid Hayat, his family, and his counsel appreciate the decision of the federal government today to dismiss the charges against him rather than seeking a retrial. That decision was obviously correct. Two federal judges have concluded that Hamid would not have been found guilty had the powerful evidence of his innocence that won his freedom in 2019 been presented to his jury in 2006. While we are grateful for the dismissal, the fourteen years Hamid spent behind bars on
charges of which he was innocent remain a grave miscarriage of justice. They serve as a stark example of how, in the post 9/11 era, the government’s effort to protect the public from terrorism could and did in this case go terribly wrong. Hamid’s exoneration is a cause for celebration, but the story of his case is tragedy that must not be repeated.”

In a statement, Hamid Hayat said “When (my attorney) Dennis said ‘Hey, congratulations, it’s over!’ I didn't believe it. Honestly, it was like a dream. Thank you to my family, CAIR-Sacramento, my legal team and my supporters for standing by me every step of the way.”

After being locked up for more than 13 years in a Phoenix, Ariz. prison, Hayat was released in August 2019 after an order was filed by U.S. District Judge Garland E. Burrell Jr. on July 30, 2019 to vacate Hayat’s conviction.

Judge Burrell Jr. was the original trial judge in the widely-criticized case that was recently highlighted in an episode of “The Confession Tapes” on Netflix.

References

Other sources
McCulloch, J and Wilson, D (2016) Pre-crime: Preemption, Precaution and the Future https://www.routledge.com/products/9781138781696

External links
 U.S. v. Hamid Hayat and Umer Hayat, facsimile of criminal complaint
 The Lodi Five, with numerous links to original trial documents
 PBS interview with ex-FBI agent James Wedick Jr.
 The FBI's rebuttal to Wedick's accusations

American people of Pakistani descent
People convicted on terrorism charges
People convicted of making false statements
1983 births
Living people
Pakistani Islamists
Naturalized citizens of the United States